County is a county in the east of Zhejiang province, China. It is under the administration of the city of Ningbo.

Administrative divisions
Subdistricts:
Dandong Subdistrict (丹东街道), Danxi Subdistrict (丹西街道), Juexi Subdistrict (爵溪街道)

Towns:
Dingtang (定塘镇), Daxu (大徐镇), Hepu (鹤浦镇), Qiangtou (墙头镇), Shipu (石浦镇), Sizhoutou (泗洲头镇), Tuci (涂茨镇), Xinqiao (新桥镇), Xianyang (贤庠镇), Xizhou (西周镇)

Townships:
Dongchen Township (东陈乡), Gaotangdao Township (高塘岛乡), Huangbi'ao Township (黄避岙乡), Maoyang Township (茅洋乡), Xiaotang Township (晓塘乡)

Climate

References

 
County-level divisions of Zhejiang
Geography of Ningbo